Rosemary Vandenbroucke (born September 18, 1981) is a French-born model, singer, songwriter, actress, and certified yoga instructor.

Early life 
In 1981, Vandenbroucke was born in Hong Kong. Vandenbroucke's father is French-Russian and her mother Julie is Chinese.
Vandenbroucke grew up in France. At age 13, Vandenbroucke returned to Hong Kong.

Career 
At age 14, Vandenbroucke won the second Elite Model Look contest, and in 1998 became model for the Yves Saint Laurent brand. 
In 2006, Vandenbroucke's debut album is in English, but includes Mandarin versions of two singles, "In my dreams" and "I didn't know", and a Cantonese version of a third, "Tonight."

In acting, Vandenbroucke has starred in a Singaporean TV musical drama called "The Kitchen Musical." The series premiered on 21 October 2011 and has been broadcast in 19 countries across Southeast Asia and Europe. Vandenbroucke was nominated for the best actress in a drama series at the 52nd Monte Carlo Film and Television Awards 2012.

In 2010, Vandenbroucke was arrested while attending the Burning Man festival near Reno, Nevada, facing misdemeanor and felony charges. Vandenbroucke pled guilty to obstructing a police officer in a plea where she served no jail time and was fined $1,000.

In 2016, Vandenbroucke produced a Daybreaker dance-party in Hong Kong.
Vandenbroucke has been a certified yoga instructor.

Filmography 
 2001 La Brassiere - Eileen.
 2003 Spy Dad - Rosemary.
 2010 Hot Summer Days - Beach girl.
 2016 Lady Bloodfight - Yara.

Personal life 
Vandenbroucke is fluent in English, French, Cantonese and Mandarin. 
In 2013 at the end of the Great Wall Marathon, Jason Swamy proposed to Vandenbroucke.  On December 6, 2015, Vandenbroucke married Jason Swamy in India. Jason Swamy is a creator and director of festivals in United States.

Discography
 Dreams come true Rogers Music 2006, single
 The Kitchen Musical Soundtrack Universal Music 2012, Album

References

External links
 
 
 

1981 births
Living people
21st-century Hong Kong women singers
Hong Kong female models
21st-century Hong Kong actresses